Royston Albert Fransen (born 4 January 1916 in Tottenham, north London, England; died 5 July 1985) was a British high diver and stuntman. He was best known for his public displays of high and acrobatic diving, usually into shallow depth tanks and pools. These high dives were often performed with both diver and water surface being set ablaze with burning petrol. Roy Fransen's professional high and fire diving career lasted over 40 years until his accident and death in 1985 during a performance, when turned 69.

Career

Early diving
As a youth and during the 1930s, to improve his athletic hobby and sporting skills, he practiced dry and without water at home in suburban Pinner, diving from a springboard into safety-netting set up in his parents' back garden.

In the late 1940s together with his elder brothers and friends, including stuntman/diver George Baines and Vera Beaumont, diving beauty, Fransen created a high dive stunt and show, simply to generate an income. This it did, and within two seasons had grown into a full-scale water show production called Aqua-revue. Enjoying popularity at open air lidos and indoor swimming pools, a troupe of 20 to 30 performed a mix of acrobatic water skills, beauty, comedy and danger. Roy Fransen's Aqua Show, plus Aqua-Belles and Aqua-Zanies, toured many UK holiday resorts well into the mid-1950s.

Record dive
This acrobatic diving record was in the category of highest dive into shallow water. Whilst not including fire, it incorporated a full somersault followed by a head-first entry into a  diameter (above ground) diving tank. During his lifetime Roy Fransen remained the unchallenged European high and fire diving champion.

The Dive of Death
By 1960 a more compact arena show was performed. This was billed The Dive of Death, and as a spectacle attracted large audiences. Circus and trade fairs throughout the capital cities of the world were regularly visited. Many European and UK television broadcasts were transmitted. Timex, of wrist watch fame, ran a TV ad campaign praising their product's longevity - successfully enduring several 'On Fire Into Fire' high dives, whilst strapped upon Roy's wrist.

Also, the small surface area of the water tank hardly compared to any swimming pool.

However, the Dive of Death, as posters announced, including its On Fire Into Fire sub-title, left little to the imagination exactly what the purpose of the equipment was for. The tank and tower were both extreme in their respective small and high proportions.

At whatever venue it was performed, the 'Dive of Death' was usually saved until after dark, allowing the flames to add greater drama. Whereas in daytime, Roy, wearing only swimming trunks, would dive into burning petrol spread upon the water surface. This was not without danger. Severe burns to bare legs and feet resulted from diving through an excessive column of flame. Likewise, thick dense smoke rising from the tank surface, could linger and so obscure Roy's targeting aim.

Otherwise the 'On Fire, Into Fire' dive was performed—on occasions thrice daily. Then Roy would wear a full body costume: a silver painted cotton boiler-suit. Doused with petrol himself, a moment was selected to set alight both tank and diver.

Every dive, even without fire, required precision alignment and split-second reactions. Head first (swallow dive) entry into the tank itself—a mere  in diameter—demanded perfect aim and a secure launch from the diving platform above. Every high dive was a very dangerous daredevil feat.

Death
Sadly, on 5 July 1985, during a public performance in South West London, Roy Fransen died whilst attempting his Dive of Death for the final time. He was then aged 69, and remained a very fit man for his years.

External links 
 Stunt Diver (1948) (British Pathé via YouTube)
 High Diver (1958) (British Pathé via YouTube)

1916 births
1985 deaths
Diving deaths
English male divers
English stunt performers
Male high divers
Sportspeople from London